Ashford Airport can refer to:-

Lympne Airport, known as Ashford-Lympne Airport from Easter 1968 until its closure in the mid-1970s.
Lydd - London Ashford Airport, still in operation.